Jennifer Constance Lee Smith (born 2 December 1948) is an English professional golfer, known for winning the inaugural Women's British Open in 1976 at Fulford Golf Club, York, England and later winning the Order of Merit on the Women's Professional Golf Association tour (now Ladies European Tour) in 1981 and 1982.

Lee-Smith was born and raised in Newcastle upon Tyne and started playing golf at a relatively young age. After some success in regional tournaments in the late 1960s and early 1970s, she began to play in international tournaments.  She was a member of the Great Britain Curtis Cup team in both 1974 and 1976, represented England in the 1975 European Team Championships, and played for Great Britain & Ireland in the 1976 Espirito Santo Trophy.

In 1976, while still an amateur, Lee-Smith won the inaugural Ladies' British Open (now the Women's British Open). There were only a handful of professional women golfers in the United Kingdom at the time, and the field was mostly made up of amateurs.  At the end of the year, she was voted Daks Woman Golfer of the Year along with Tegwen Perkins.

Lee-Smith turned professional in 1977, and qualified for the LPGA Tour that year.  The Women's Professional Golf Association was formed in 1978, and Lee-Smith joined the tour for its first year in 1979.  She finished 8th on the money list that year, third in 1980, and won the Order of Merit as the leading money winner in both 1981 and 1982. She was voted the 1982 North East Sports Personality Of The Year.

Lee-Smith now resides in Tenterden, Kent, England, with her family. She has three children (Katie, Josh, and Ben) and is married to Sam Lucas.

In 2012, Lee-Smith discovered that she had a twin sister living in Northumberland. Together they co-authored a book My Secret Sister about their experience under her married name of Jenny Lucas with Helen Edwards.

Amateur wins
1974 Wills Women's International Match Play
1976 Newmark International

Professional wins (12)

Ladies European Tour wins (10)
1979 Carlsberg Championship – Arcot Hall
1980 Volvo International Tournament, Carlsberg Championship – Shifnal, Robert Winsor Productions Championship, Manchester Evening News Pro-Am Classic
1981 Sposts Space Championship, McEwan's Lager Welsh Classic, Lambert & Butler Matchplay
1982 Ford Ladies Classic
1984 British Olivetti Tournament

Other wins (2)
1974 Wills International Matchplay Tournament
1976 Ladies' British Open (as an amateur)

Team appearances
Amateur
Curtis Cup (representing Great Britain & Ireland): 1974, 1976
Espirito Santo Trophy (representing Great Britain & Ireland): 1976
Commonwealth Trophy (representing Great Britain): 1975 (winners)
European Ladies' Team Championship (representing England): 1975
Women's Home Internationals (representing England): 1973 (winners), 1974, 1975 (winners), 1976 (winners)

References

English female golfers
Ladies European Tour golfers
LPGA Tour golfers
Sportspeople from Newcastle upon Tyne
People from Tenterden
1948 births
Living people